Thomas Wicksteed (26 January 1806 – 15 November 1871) was a notable English civil engineer of the 19th century. As engineer to the East London Waterworks Company he was responsible for introducing the Cornish pumping engine. He oversaw many improvements, and was approached for advice by a number of water companies elsewhere in the country, later turning his attention to the efficient handling of sewage.

Career
Born in Shrewsbury, the fourth son of John Wicksteed, he was educated at Shrewsbury School, and at sixteen years of age he was sent to London, to reside with his father's old friend, Arthur Aikin, Secretary of the Society of Arts, with whom he lived. He was articled to a mechanical engineer in Smithfield, and at the end of his apprenticeship, became an assistant to Henry R. Palmer, Engineer to the London Docks, at a time when extensive additions were being made.

In 1829, he became the Engineer to the East London Waterworks Company. It was a time when costly additions to the reservoirs and pumping-engines had to be made, but these were offset by the large saving he was able to make, particularly in the consumption of fuel.

In 1835 his attention was directed to the Cornish engine as a replacement for the less economical condensing engine. He visited the Cornish mines, conducted experiments, and prevailed upon the directors of the company to invest in this new technology. In 1837 an engine from Cornwall was installed in the works at Old Ford. The savings were such that he carried out careful measurements for a year, and published his findings in 1841 in a paper entitled "An Experimental Inquiry concerning the relative power of, and useful effect produced by, the Cornish and Boulton and Watt pumping-engines, and cylindrical and waggon-head boilers" read to the Institution of Civil Engineers. Following this, several large engines were installed under his direction by various water companies about London.

Meanwhile, he carried out various additions to the reservoirs and other works of the company. Among these was to transfer the source of the company’s supply from Old Ford to Lea Bridge up river from the tidal flow.

Between 1838 and 1845, he was retained as Consulting Engineer to the Grand Junction, Vauxhall, Southwark, and Kent Waterwork Companies, while still Resident Engineer to the East London Water Works. He was thus, at one time, engineer to five out of the then nine London water companies. During this time, he constructed new waterworks at Hull and Wolverhampton, with extensions to those at Brighton and Scarborough. He was also consulted by the towns of Leeds, Liverpool, Dewsbury, Lichfield, Leamington, Cork, Kingston in Jamaica, Valparaiso, Boston, in the United States, the
waterworks and sewerage of Berlin and consulted by the Pasha of Egypt in reference to the barrage of the Nile.

His attention having been drawn to the sewerage of towns, and its disposal, he became the Engineer to the London Sewage Company in 1847. Plans for a sewer along the North bank of the Thames to a pumping station and reservoir at Barking Creek were prepared to put before Parliament on behalf of the company, but necessary investment was not forthcoming and the company was subsequently dissolved. His plan was
similar to that which he had proposed for Berlin in 1841, and he then built a system at Leicester. With the aim of purifying the sewage of towns, and producing manure, he set up the Patent Solid Sewage Manure Company. At this point he resigned as Engineer to the East London Waterworks in 1851 and severed his connections with the other London companies.
	
The Patent Solid Sewage Manure Company at Leicester was successful in purifying sewage, with a marked improvement to the River Soar but, though large quantities of manure were produced it could not compete with others on the market. In the end, the company failed and the corporation took over the sewage purifying.

Besides carrying out a complete system of drainage for Leicester, he was consulted on the sewerage of Leeds, Leamington, Maidstone, and Scarborough ; and gave evidence before the Special Committee on the Sewage of the Metropolis.

He was elected a Member of the Institution of Civil Engineers on 7 February 1837 and contributed several papers on the Cornish engine, for which he received a Telford medal in 1839. He had a seat on the Council from 1840 to 1843, but for many years before his death he had ceased to attend the meetings and to take part in the discussions. In 1863 he was elected also to the Institution of Mechanical Engineers.

Personal life
On 20 July 1829 at St John, Hackney, he married Eliza, the third daughter of the late Mr. John Barton, of London, by whom he had six children - Bithia (1831-1874), Katharine (1833–1884), Mary (1834-1834), Mary Frances (1835-1906), Arthur Aikin (1840-1903) and Eliza Lucy (1845-1923).

His health was adversely affected by his labours in Leicester, and in 1865, he had what was described at the time as a slight attack of paralysis, and retired. He died at Headingley, near Leeds, on 15 November 1871, aged 65.

References
 

London water infrastructure
English civil engineers
Water supply and sanitation in London